Vedaranyam is a legislative assembly constituency in Nagapattinam district in the Indian state of Tamil Nadu. This constituency comprises Vedharanyam and Thalaignayiru Panchayat union. It is one of the 234 State Legislative Assembly Constituencies in Tamil Nadu, in India.

The most successful party is DMK, having won six times.

Madras State

Tamil Nadu

Election Results

2021

2016

2011

2006

2001

1996

1991

1989

1984

1980

1977

1971

1967

1962

References 

 

Assembly constituencies of Tamil Nadu
Nagapattinam district